Neomicropteryx bifurca is a species of moth belonging to the family Micropterigidae. It was described by Syuti Issiki in 1953. It is known from Japan.

The length of the forewings is 5-5.8 mm for males and 5.1-5.5 mm for females.

References

Micropterigidae
Moths described in 1953
Moths of Japan